Admiral Aplin was an East Indiaman of two decks, sailing under charter to the British East India Company (EIC). She made one complete voyage for the EIC before a French privateer captured her in 1804 on her second voyage. She may have returned to British ownership, only again to fall prey to a second French privateer in 1807; she subsequently foundered.

Career
For Admiral Aplins first voyage Captain John Rogers left The Downs on 20 May 1802, bound for Madras. She arrived at Madras on 25 September. On 3 January 1803 she was at St Helena, and on 31 March she arrived at Deptford.

For her second voyage Captain Rodgers left Portsmouth on 28 August 1803, bound for Ceylon, Madras, and Bengal. Because he was sailing in wartime, the Napoleonic Wars having commenced while Admiral Aplin was on her way home from her first journey, Rodgers took out a letter of marque, which she received on 20 August.

At 6:30 a.m. on 3 January 1804, Admiral Aplin sighted a strange sail. A six-day chase ensued before the French pursuer was able to catch up with her quarry. Unable to escape, Rodgers decided to fire on his pursuer in the hopes of damaging her rigging. Admiral Aplin was carrying a number of passengers. One army captain was killed and another dangerously wounded. Two crewmen were also wounded. The French vessel, which turned out to be the privateer frigate Psyché, had two men dangerously wounded.

Psyché was 35 days out of Île de France (Mauritius), but had made no captures prior to encountering Admiral Aplin.

The EIC put the value of its cargo lost when the French captured her at £15,240.

Danish interests purchased Admiral Aplin and renamed her La Land.

Possible subsequent fate
Admiral Aplin may have returned to British ownership and resumed her original name. On 27 September 1807, the privateer Robert Surcouf, in Revenant, captured an Admiral Aplin, which was carrying 9,500 bags of rice from Bengal to Bombay. He put a prize crew on board, and sent her to Île de France.

On 15 October, Clyde picked up Admiral Aplins crew, which Surcouf had put into her boats. The same early account attributed the capture to the French frigate Piémontaise, and also reported that Admiral Aplin had subsequently foundered.

Admiral Aplin had foundered on the Coromandel Coast on her way to Île de France. Only two men of her crew survived.

Post-script
When the French captured Admiral Aplin in 1804 they also captured some 73 letters that the government published in a special edition of the official newspaper, Le Moniteur Universel.

Notes

Citations

References

 
  
 

Ships of the British East India Company
1802 ships
Ships built by Temple shipbuilders
Captured ships
Maritime incidents in 1807